Do They Hurt? (1980) is the fifth album by British jazz fusion group Brand X. The tracks on this album are outtakes from the Product sessions. ("Noddy Goes to Sweden" was a B-side from Product.)

Track listing

Side one
"Noddy Goes to Sweden" (Jones) – 4:30
"Voidarama" (Goodsall) – 4:21
"Act of Will" (Goodsall) – 4:43
"Fragile" (Jones, Robinson) – 5:26

Side two
 "Cambodia" (Goodsall) – 4:31
"Triumphant Limp" (Goodsall, Giblin, Lumley, Collins) – 7:34
"D.M.Z." (Jones) – 8:39

Personnel
 John Goodsall – guitar (except 1), vocals (3)
 J. Peter Robinson – keyboards (1 - 5), Synth (6), Gong (5, 6) 
 Robin Lumley – piano (2), keyboards (6)
 Percy Jones – bass (1, 3 - 5, 7), vocals (1)
 John Giblin – bass (2, 6)
 Mike Clark – drums (1, 3 - 5, 7)
 Phil Collins – drums (2, 6)
 Morris Pert – percussion (1, 4)

Notes
 Robin Lumley (2002): "To this day I can proudly count Michael Palin and Terry Jones as good pals! I got Mike to do the sleeve notes on Do They Hurt? (which is itself a line from Holy Grail (witch sequence)... He wanted 25 pence for writing the notes... Charisma didn't pay him so he threatened to sue! (a joke of course)".
 "Act of Will" is sung through a vocoder. John Goodsall himself said, in a private e-mail, that there were never any written lyrics. Various attempts have been made to puzzle out what he is saying, but the words are likely similar to "Masoko Tanga" by The Police and are not always words.
 This album consists of out-takes from the Product sessions. Because "Noddy Goes to Sweden" was included on this album, the song "Pool Room Blues" gains the distinction of being one of two non-album Brand X songs (along with "Genocide of the Straights" from X-Cerpts).

References

External links

Brand X albums
1980 albums
Albums with cover art by Hipgnosis
Albums produced by Neil Kernon
Charisma Records albums
Passport Records albums